Eric Swanson (born August 25, 1963) is a former American football wide receiver. He played for the St. Louis Cardinals in 1986.

References

1963 births
Living people
American football wide receivers
Tennessee Volunteers football players
St. Louis Cardinals (football) players
Players of American football from California
Sportspeople from San Bernardino, California